Arthur Thomas Tienken (August 5, 1922 Yonkers, New York - May 7, 2006, Arlington, Virginia) was an American career Foreign Service Officer who held ambassadorships to Gabon, Sao Tome, and Principe (1978-1981).

Tienken graduated from Princeton University, earning a bachelor's in 1946 (political science) and a master's in international relations at the Woodrow Wilson School of Public and International Affairs in 1950. Tienken entered with the Class of ‘44 but took time off from his studies, serving as a first lieutenant in the 3094th Quartermaster Company of the Western Pacific in the Philippines during World War II.

His first position in the Foreign Service, in 1950, was as a Kreis resident officer, or district governor, in Germany.  He served in various the Belgian Congo, Mozambique, Zambia, Tuniasia and Ethiopia. He then spent four years at the embassy in Brussels.  Upon his return stateside, he attended the Naval War College in Newport, Rhode Island and was a diplomat-in-residence at Marquette University.  He retired in 1987.

Tienken died of stomach cancer at his home.

References

Ambassadors of the United States to Gabon
Princeton School of Public and International Affairs alumni
Deaths from cancer in Virginia
People from Arlington County, Virginia
Ambassadors of the United States to São Tomé and Príncipe
1922 births
2006 deaths
United States Army personnel of World War II
American expatriates in the Philippines
American expatriates in Germany
American expatriates in Belgium
Marquette University people
American expatriates in the Belgian Congo
American expatriates in Mozambique
American expatriates in Zambia
American expatriates in Tunisia
American expatriates in Ethiopia
20th-century American diplomats